Carola Schneider (born 11 March 1993) is a Danish footballer who plays as a midfielder for KoldingQ in the Elitedivisionen and formerly for the Denmark women's national under-19 football team. She has also playing college soccer in the United States for Lindsey Wilson College in 2013, until she went back to Denmark in KoldingQ, in 2015.

She participated at the 2012 UEFA Women's Under-19 Championship in Turkey.

Honours

Club
KoldingQ
 Danish Cup
 Runners-up: 2018

References

External links
Profile at Danish Football Association 
 
 
 

1993 births
Living people
Danish women's footballers
Denmark women's international footballers
Women's association football midfielders
Lindsey Wilson Blue Raiders women's soccer players
People from Kolding
Sportspeople from the Region of Southern Denmark